Mary Christianna Lewis (née Milne; 17 December 1907 – 11 March 1988), known professionally as Christianna Brand, was a British crime writer and children's author born in British Malaya.

Biography 
Christianna Brand was born Mary Christianna Milne (1907) in Malaya but spent most of her childhood in England and India. She had a number of different occupations, including model, dancer, shop assistant and governess. Brand also wrote under the pseudonyms Mary Ann Ashe, Annabel Jones, Mary Brand, Mary Roland, and China Thompson.  Christianna Brand served as chair of the Crime Writers' Association from 1972 to 1973.

She married Roland Lewis. Mary Lewis died on 11 March 1988, aged 80. Her estate was valued at £96 417.

Her first novel, Death in High Heels, was written while Brand was working as a salesgirl, the idea stemming from her fantasies about doing away with an annoying co-worker. In 1941, one of her best-loved characters, Inspector Cockrill of the Kent County Police, made his debut in the book Heads You Lose.  The character would go on to appear in seven of her novels. Green for Danger is Brand's most famous novel. The whodunit, set in a World War II hospital, was adapted for film by Eagle-Lion Films in 1946, starring Alastair Sim as the Inspector. She dropped the series in the late 1950s and concentrated on various other genres as well as short stories. She was nominated three times for Edgar Awards: for the short stories "Poison in the Cup" (EQMM, Feb. 1969) and "Twist for Twist" (EQMM, May 1967) and for a nonfiction work about a Scottish murder case, Heaven Knows Who (1960). She is the author of the children's series Nurse Matilda, which Emma Thompson adapted to film as Nanny McPhee (2005).

Her Inspector Cockrill short stories and a previously unpublished Cockrill stage play were collected as The Spotted Cat and Other Mysteries from Inspector Cockrill's Casebook, edited by Tony Medawar (2002).

She was the cousin of the illustrator Edward Ardizzone.

Bibliography

Novels

As Christianna Brand

Novels featuring Inspector Charlesworth
 Death in High Heels (1941)
 The Rose in Darkness (1979)

Novels featuring Inspector Cockrill
 Heads You Lose (1941)
 Green for Danger (1944) . Serialised in the United States as Danger List
 Suddenly at His Residence (US title: The Crooked Wreath) (1946) . Serialised in the United States as One of the Family
 Death of Jezebel (1948)
 London Particular (US title: Fog of Doubt) (1952)
 Tour de Force (1955)
 The Spotted Cat and Other Mysteries from Inspector Cockrill's Casebook (Crippen & Landru, 2002)

Novels featuring Inspector Chucky
 Cat and Mouse (1950)

Non-series titles
The Three Cornered Halo (1957)
Court of Foxes (1969)
The Honey Harlot (1978)
The Brides of Aberdar (1982)

Collections
 What Dread Hand? (1968): 
The Hornets' Nest (Inspector Cockrill)
Aren't Our Police Wonderful?
The Merry-Go-Round
Blood Brothers (Cockrill)
Dear Mr Editor ...
The Rose
Akin to Love ... 
Death of Don Juan
Double Cross
The Sins of the Fathers ...
After the Event
Death of a Ghost
The Kite
Hic Jacet ...
Murder Game
 Brand X (1974)  
The Niece from Scotland
A Miracle in Montepulciano (essay)
Such a Nice Man
I Will Repay
How the Unicorn Became Extinct (essay)
The Kite
Charm Farm
A Bit of Bovver
The Blackthorn
The Hilltop
How Green Is My Valley! (essay)
Bless This House
Spring 1941 (essay)
Murder Hath Charms
An Apple for the Teacher (essay)
Pigeon Pie
Madame Thinks Quick
The Scapegoat
 Buffet for Unwelcome Guests (1983)
After the Event (Inspector Cockrill)
Blood Brothers (Cockrill)
The Hornet's Nest (Cockrill)
Poison in the Cup
Murder Game
The Scapegoat
No More a-Maying ...
The Niece from Scotland
Hic Jacet ...
The Merry-Go-Round
Upon Reflection
From the Balcony ...
Bless This House
Such a Nice Man
The Whispering
The Hand of God
 The Spotted Cat and Other Mysteries from Inspector Cockrill's Casebook (2002):
Inspector Cockrill (essay)
After the Event (Cockrill)
Blood Brothers (Cockrill)
The Hornet's Nest (Cockrill)
Poison in the Cup (Cockrill)
The Telephone Call (Cockrill)
The Kissing Cousin (Cockrill)
The Rocking-Chair (Cockrill)
The Man on the Roof (Cockrill)
Alleybi (Cockrill)
The Spotted Cat (Cockrill)

Books for children
 Welcome to Danger (1949) juvenile mystery, also published as Danger Unlimited
 Nurse Matilda (Leicester: Brockhampton Press, 1964), illustrated by Edward Ardizzone
 Nurse Matilda Goes to Town (Leicester: Brockahmpton Press,1967), illustrated by Edward Ardizzone
 Nurse Matilda Goes to Hospital (Leicester: Brockhampton Press, 1974), illustrated by Edward Ardizzone

As Mary Roland
 The Single Pilgrim (1946)

As China Thompson
 Starrbelow (1958)

As Annabel Jones
 The Radiant Dove (1975)

As Mary Ann Ashe
 Alas, for Her That Met Me! (1976)
 A Ring of Roses (1977)

Unpublished novels
 Take off the Roof (Non-series)
 Jape de Chine or The Chinese Puzzle (Cockrill)

Non-fiction books
 Heaven Knows Who (1960)

Uncollected short stories

As Mary Brand
 Dance Hostess. The Star, 8 April 1939
 Gloria Walked down Bond Street. The Tatler, 1939

As Christianna Brand
Shadowed Sunlight. Woman, 7 July to 11 August 1945
Hibiscus Blooms Again.
Mother. Woman, 17 January 1959 (romantic story)
Grandad. Woman, 24 October 1959 (romantic story)
The Right Man for Tilly. Woman, 12 May 1960 (romantic story)
Someone to Love. Woman, 1 October 1960 (romantic story)
To Remember with Tears. Woman, 3 May 1962 (romantic story)
White Wedding. Woman, 19 May 1962 (romantic story)
Cloud Nine. Published in Verdict of Thirteen: A Detection Club Anthology (1979)
Over My Dead Body. Ellery Queen's Mystery Magazine, August 1979
A Piece of Cake. Ellery Queen's Mystery Magazine, January 1983
And She Smiled at Me. Ellery Queen's Mystery Magazine, May 1983
To the Widow. The Saint Magazine, June 1984
Bank Holiday Murder. Ellery Queen's Mystery Magazine, September/October 2017
Cyanide in the Sun. Daily Sketch, August 1958. An edited version was published in an anthology, The Realm of the Impossible (2018)
The Rum Punch. Published in Bodies from the Library, ed. by Tony Medawar (2018)

Unpublished short stories
The Dead Hold Fast (Inspector Charlesworth)
Inquest 
The Little Nun
The Mermaid 
Murder by Dog 
The Murder Man
The Codicil

Uncollected short non-fiction

As Christianna Brand
Ball or Skein. The Times, 16 February 1944 (Published anonymously)
The Detective Story Form. Press and Freelance Writer and Photographer, August 1950
May I Introduce Myself?. Ellery Queen's Mystery Magazine (Japanese edition), March 1983
Famous Writers I've Known in the Long Ago Past. Ellery Queen's Mystery Magazine (Japanese edition), July 1983

Anthologies edited by Christianna Brand
Naughty Children: An Anthology (London: Victor Gollancz, 1962), illustrated by Edward Ardizzone

References 

1907 births
1988 deaths
British mystery writers
Members of the Detection Club
British children's writers
20th-century British novelists
Women mystery writers
20th-century British women writers